Trinidad and Tobago NREN (TTRENT) is a national research and education network in Trinidad and Tobago.

References

External links
 

Communications in Trinidad and Tobago
Educational organisations based in Trinidad and Tobago
National research and education networks
Supercomputer sites